Jean-Pierre Urbing (22 July 1899 – 3 May 1975) was a Luxembourgian gymnast. He competed in seven events at the 1928 Summer Olympics.

References

1899 births
1975 deaths
Luxembourgian male artistic gymnasts
Olympic gymnasts of Luxembourg
Gymnasts at the 1928 Summer Olympics
Sportspeople from Luxembourg City
20th-century Luxembourgian people